Abubakar Kamara (born 19 August 1970) is a Sierra Leonean footballer. He played in 12 matches for the Sierra Leone national football team from 1994 to 1997. He was also named in Sierra Leone's squad for the 1994 African Cup of Nations tournament.

References

External links
 

1970 births
Living people
Sierra Leonean footballers
Sierra Leone international footballers
1994 African Cup of Nations players
Association football defenders
Sportspeople from Freetown